Growing Up Hip Hop: Atlanta is the second installment of the Growing Up Hip Hop reality television franchise on WE tv. The series premiered on May 25, 2017, and chronicles the lives of the children of hip hop legends in Atlanta.

On September 29, 2020, the series was renewed for a 10-episode fourth season, which premiered on January 7, 2021.

Cast

Main

Current
Bow Wow
Real name Shad Moss, Moss released his first album Beware of Dog in 2000 as Lil' Bow Wow at the age of 13 under the guidance of Snoop Dogg and Jermaine Dupri. He has released five other studio albums since his debut. Moss was the host of the music video countdown show 106 & Park from 2012 to 2014. Moss has acted in many movies and television shows including Like Mike and CSI: Cyber. The first season showcases Bow Wow returning to Atlanta to record his final studio album and reconnecting with his father. Joie's baby father, Masika's ex-lover, Angela's ex-boyfriend and later, his fiancee in the final 10 episodes and third season and Corri's fling.

Shaniah Mauldin
Daughter of Jermaine Dupri. During the second half of season 2, she reveals she wants to start a clothing line that her father does not take as serious.

Ayana Fite
Daughter of DJ Hurricane. In the first season, Ayana tries to become more serious with her girlfriend Amy and, being Brandon's cousin, finds herself in the middle of Reginae and Brandon's beef. After working in retail for several years, she decided to start her own clothing line, Cozy Closet. Although the clothing line was successful, she ultimately decided that it was not her passion, and made the decision to not pursue it any further. She also takes a major step in introducing her father to her girlfriend Amy, as well as prep for a breast reduction surgery.

Deb Antney (Season 2–present) (supporting cast member in season 1)
Godmother of Brandon Barnes & mother of Waka Flocka Flame. Deb has developed the career of her son Waka along with French Montana, Gucci Mane and Nicki Minaj. Deb comes into conflict with Brandon, Toya, and Tiny in the first season.

Da Brat (Season 2–present) (supporting cast member in season 1)
Da Brat is a rapper who was the first female rapper to go platinum with her album Funkdafied on Jermaine Dupri's So So Def label. Da Brat is currently apart of The Rickey Smiley Morning Show and Dish Nation. Da Brat serves as a support system for Bow Wow.

Waka Flocka Flame (Season 3–present)
Rapper and son of Deb Antney.

Tammy Rivera (Season 3–present)
R&B artist. Also the Wife of rapper Waka Flocka.

Reemarkable (Season 3–present)
Daughter of Eazy-E and new upcoming artist.

Diamond' (Season 4–present)
Rapper. Member of Crime Mob. Pimpin's EX girlfriend.

Lelee Lyons (Season 4–present) 
R&B artist. Member of SWV

Former
Zonnique Pullins (Seasons 1–2)
Daughter of Tameka "Tiny" Cottle-Harris and stepdaughter of T.I. Pullins first came to public attention appearing in Tiny & Toya and later in T.I. & Tiny: The Family Hustle. Pullins was formerly a member of the OMG Girlz, who released a number of singles including "Gucci This (Gucci That)" and which was nominated for a "NAACP Image Award" for Best New Artist. Pullins recently released her first solo EP titled "Love Jones". In the first season, Zonnique attempts to take control of her music career by finding a new manager in Deb Antney.

Reginae Carter (Seasons 1–2)
Daughter of Lil Wayne and Toya Wright. Carter has previously appeared in Tiny & Toya with her mother. Carter was a founding member of the OMG Girlz, but left the group before any singles were released. Carter appeared on My Super Sweet 16 in 2015, which showcased her Sweet 16. In the first season, Reginae has a major conflict with Brandon when he disrespects her father.

Brandon Barnes (Seasons 1–3)
Godson of Debra Antney. The first season showcases a major conflict between him and Reginae after he disrespects her father(Lil Wayne).Also, he tries to become a well known artist developer. During the first half of season 2, Brandon moved out of his Godmother Debra Antney's house after being confronted about all the disputes he drags her into.

Masika Kalysha (Season 2)
A former video vixen and current singer. She has a baby by rapper Fetty Wap and she was a former cast member of Love & Hip Hop: Hollywood. Bow Wow's ex-lover.

Kiyomi Leslie (Season 2)
Kiyomi Leslie is an American television personality, Actress, Singer,rapper, songwriter, model, and businesswoman. She started out working as a video vixen where she worked for artist such as Future, The Dream and Fabolous, just to name a few.

Lil Mama (Season 2)
Real name Niatia Kirkland, Lil Mama is best known for her single "Lip Gloss". : A former rapper, singer and actress. She has also ventured into acting, including her role as Lisa "Left Eye" Lopes in CrazySexyCool: The TLC Story on the VH1 network. In 2017, she also starred in When Love Kills: The Falicia Blakely Story on TV One. She will be joining the cast of Growing Up Hip Hop: New York.

Joann "Buku" Kelly (Season 3) (supporting cast member in season 4)
R&B artist. Daughter of R. Kelly and Drea Kelly.

Supporting

Appears in the first half of season two. 
Appears in the second half of season two.

Current
Jermaine Dupri
Father of Shaniah Mauldin. Jermaine Dupri is a rapper who has produced many songs and created many careers, including Kriss Kross, Bow Wow & Da Brat He is owner of the record label So So Def. Jermaine pushes Bow Wow to move back to Atlanta to be more focused on his music.

DJ Hurricane
Father of Ayana Fite. DJ Hurricane is a producer and DJ best known for working with the Beastie Boys. Hurricane supports Ayana with her future clothing line and her relationship with Amy.

Jhonni Blaze (Season 2, 4–present) (guest star in season 1)
Upcoming singer and artist of Deb Antney. Former supporting cast member of Love & Hip Hop: New York.

Teresa Caldwell (Season 2–present) (guest star in season 1)
Mother and former manager of Bow Wow.

Mona (Season 3–present)
Mother of Tammy Rivera

Drea Kelly (Season 3–present)
Ex-wife of R. Kelly

BT (Season 3–present) (guest star in season 2)
DJ at Streetz 94.5 and Bow Wow's friend.

Angela Simmons (Season 3–present)
 Bow Wow's ex-girlfriend and fiance. Daughter of Rev Run. former cast member of Growing Up Hip Hop.

Pimpin' (Season 4–present) (guest star in season 3) 
 Bow Wow's friend.

Jesseca "Judy" Dupart (Season 4–present)
 Da Brat's girlfriend.

Amy (Season 4–present) (guest star in seasons 1–3)
 Ayana's girlfriend

Khiry "Khi" Lyons (Season 4–present)
 Rapper. Lelee's son

Chevy (Season 4–present) (guest star in season 3)
 Reemarkable's boyfriend.

Former
Toya Wright (Seasons 1–2)
Mother of Reginae Carter. Toya has previously appeared on Tiny & Toya and Toya: A Family Affair. Toya comes into conflict with Deb and Brandon after Brandon disrespects Lil Wayne.

Tameka "Tiny" Harris (Seasons 1–2)
Mother of Zonnique Pullins. Tiny is a member of the R&B group Xscape and has appeared on other reality shows like Tiny & Toya and T.I. & Tiny: The Family Hustle. In the first season, Tiny has an issue with Zonnique finding another manager and she supports Toya.

Guest 
$ir D Da Realist
Joie Chavis
MC Lyte 
Kelly Price
Soulja Boy
T-Boz
Corri Moore 
LisaRaye
Lil' Eazy-E

Episodes

Series overview

Season 1 (2017)

Season 2 (2018)

Season 3 (2019)

Season 4 (2021)

Specials

References

External links

2010s American reality television series
2017 American television series debuts
2020s American reality television series
African-American reality television series
Hip hop television
Television shows set in Atlanta